Little Machias Bay is a bay in Cutler, Washington County, Maine, United States. It extends roughly 2.5 mi. by 1.5 mi. (4 km by 3 km).

References

Bays of Washington County, Maine
Bays of Maine